SS United may refer to:

SS United States
SS United Group Oil & Gas Company

See also
USS (disambiguation)